
Gmina Czarnocin is a rural gmina (administrative district) in Kazimierza County, Świętokrzyskie Voivodeship, in south-central Poland.

The gmina contains part of the protected area called Kozubów Landscape Park.

Villages
Gmina Czarnocin contains the villages and settlements of Będziaki, Bieglów, Charzowice, Cieszkowy, Ciuślice, Czarnocin, Dębiany, Kolosy, Koryto, Krzyż, Malżyce, Mękarzowice, Michałowice, Mikołajów, Miławczyce, Opatkowiczki, Soboszów, Sokolina, Stradów, Stropieszyn, Swoszowice, Turnawiec, Zagaje Stradowskie and Zagajów.

Neighbouring gminas
Gmina Czarnocin is bordered by the gminas of Działoszyce, Kazimierza Wielka, Opatowiec, Pińczów, Skalbmierz, Wiślica and Złota.

References
Polish official population figures 2006

Czarnocin
Kazimierza County